Konsta Lappalainen (born 11 August 2001) is a Finnish racing driver. He is currently driving in the GT World Challenge Europe Endurance Cup for Emil Frey Racing.

Career

Karting 
Born and raised in Espoo, Lappalainen started his karting career in 2012. His best result was winning the Finnish Karting Championship in the OK class in 2016.

Lower formulae 
In 2016 Lappalainen made his single-seater racing debut with part-time appearances in the F4 Spanish Championship. He finished all races in the top ten, however due to him being a guest driver Lappalainen didn't score any points.

The next year the Finn continued racing in Spain, whilst also driving in SMP F4. He struggled in both series however, finishing 15th and 13th in the respective championships.

In 2018, Lappalainen continued in the SMP F4 Championship. He won seven races and scored 15 podiums, winning the championship 41 points ahead of Michael Belov.

Formula Regional European Championship 
In 2019 KIC Motorsport announced that Lappalainen would drive for them in the inaugural season of the Formula Regional European Championship alongside Isac Blomqvist. He finished third at the Red Bull Ring, the only podium of his season, and ended the season in 11th in the standings.

Lappalainen would continue driving for KIC in 2020. His season would be much more successful, with the Finn scoring two podiums and finishing sixth in the drivers' championship, although Lappalainen was beaten by his teammate Patrik Pasma.

Racing record

Career summary 

† As Lappalainen was a guest driver, he was ineligible for championship points.
* Season still in progress.

Complete SMP F4 Championship results 
(key) (Races in bold indicate pole position) (Races in italics indicate fastest lap)

Complete Formula Regional European Championship results 
(key) (Races in bold indicate pole position; races in italics indicate fastest lap)

Complete GT World Challenge Europe results

GT World Challenge Europe Sprint Cup
(key) (Races in bold indicate pole position) (Races in italics indicate fastest lap)

GT World Challenge Europe Endurance Cup 
(Races in bold indicate pole position) (Races in italics indicate fastest lap)

*Season still in progress.

Complete ADAC GT Masters results
(key) (Races in bold indicate pole position) (Races in italics indicate fastest lap)

References

External links 
 
 

2001 births
Living people
Sportspeople from Espoo
Finnish racing drivers
ADAC Formula 4 drivers
Formula Regional European Championship drivers
Spanish F4 Championship drivers
SMP F4 Championship drivers
ADAC GT Masters drivers
Double R Racing drivers
SMP Racing drivers
Emil Frey Racing drivers
KIC Motorsport drivers
Karting World Championship drivers